Efficient Consumer Response (ECR) is a joint trade and industry body working towards making the grocery sector as a whole more responsive to consumer demand and promote the removal of unnecessary costs from the supply chain.

There are four focus areas under ECR: demand management, supply management, enablers and integrators, which are intended to be addressed as an integrated set. These form the basis of the ECR Global Scorecard.

ECR Community
In September 2016, ECR Community replaced ECR Europe as the focal point for consumer goods retailers and manufacturers to work together for the benefit of consumers across Europe. Owned and managed by the ECR National Associations, which span and the international ECR Shrink and On Shelf Availability group. These associations are supported by over 1,800 retailers, manufacturers and service providers.

ECR Europe
ECR Europe was launched in 1994. With its headquarters in Brussels, the organization works in co-operation with national ECR initiatives in most European countries. Participation in projects at European and national levels is open to companies in the grocery and fast-moving consumer goods sectors – including retailers, wholesalers, manufacturers, suppliers, brokers and third-party service providers such as logistics operators.

External links
 ECR Community
 ECR Community Platform (incl. Europe and Asia Pacific)
 ECR Global Scorecard
 Scientific Essay about Efficient Consumer Response in German (strategies, cooperations)

Management organizations
Food industry trade groups